The RWD-16 was a Polish two-seat low-wing sports plane of 1936, constructed by the RWD team, that remained a prototype.

Development
The aircraft was designed in 1935 by Andrzej Anczutin of the RWD bureau, as a light and economical sports plane. The plane was a wooden low-wing monoplane, with two seats side-by-side in a closed cockpit, powered by 50 hp Walter Mikron I straight engine.

The prototype was built and first flown in early 1936 (registration SP-AXY), funded by the Polish division of Osram factory. The plane did not appear a successful design, though. Test revealed lack of directional stability, therefore its rudder was much enlarged, the wings were fitted with fixed slats and a windshield was redesigned. It did not improve the situation much, and in 1937-1938 the prototype was rebuilt and fitted with stronger 60 hp Avia 3 engine in a lengthened nose, while the vertical stabilizer and rudder were made smaller. Most significant feature became a front windshield with a negative slope.

After final changes, the prototype still was not satisfactory, but it served as a basis for the RWD-16bis design, which was a new, redesigned aircraft, produced as the RWD-21. The prototype RWD-16 was given then to a known touring aviator Zbigniew Babiński.

Description
Wooden construction low-wing cantilever monoplane, conventional in layout, with a fixed landing gear and a closed cockpit. The fuselage was semi-monocoque, plywood-covered. Single-piece trapezoid wings with rounded tips, two-spar, plywood (in front) and canvas covered. Conventional cantilever empennage, plywood (fins) and canvas (elevators and rudder) covered. Two seats side-by-side, with twin controls, under a common canopy, with a fixed windshield. Conventional fixed landing gear with a rear skid.

 Walter Mikron I inline engine in front, with two-blade wooden propeller Szomański, 1.8 m diameter. In later variant,  Avia 3 inline engine was installed.

Specifications (RWD 16bis)

References

External links

Photos and drawings at Ugolok Neba

1930s Polish sport aircraft
RWD-16
Low-wing aircraft
Single-engined tractor aircraft
Aircraft first flown in 1936